Dorel-Gheorghe Acatrinei (born 18 April 1977) is a Romanian politician. He was elected to the Chamber of Deputies in December 2020.

References 

Living people
1977 births
Place of birth missing (living people)
21st-century Romanian politicians
Members of the Chamber of Deputies (Romania)